A by-election was held for the Australian House of Representatives seat of Swan on 21 December 1940. This was triggered by the death of Country Party MP Henry Gregory.

The by-election was won by Country Party candidate Thomas Marwick, who had been a member of the Senate from 1936 to 1937.

Results

References

1940 elections in Australia
Western Australian federal by-elections
1940s in Western Australia